Leyla Pınar is a Turkish harpsichordist and musicologist. She is the founder and artistic director of the Istanbul Barok ensemble and the International Istanbul Baroque Music Festival, which she founded in 1994. Pınar also teaches in the Drama and Music Department of Yıldız Technical University in Istanbul.

"Istanbul Barok"
Istanbul Barok was founded by Leyla Pınar in 1975, initially as harpsichord, violin and flute trio. In 1995, she expanded the group to an international touring ensemble performing concerts, opera, and ballet featuring baroque music.

Recordings
Leyla Pinar: Clavecin. Label: Pavane ADW 7225
Leyla Pinar: Yeni Bir Deyiş. Label: Night And Day
Leyla Pinar & İstanbul Barok: Osmanlı Barok Müziği (Ottoman Baroque Music). Label: Kalan

References

Çobankent, Yeşim, İstanbul’un baroklukları, Hürriyet, 14 May 1999. Accessed 11 January 2008. (In Turkish)
Kargül, Erem, Interview with Leyla Pınar, Turkishtime, May–June 2003, reprinted in English translation on artenite.com. Accessed 11 January 2008.
Martin, Serge, Campra au Printemps Baroque du Sablon, Une Europe Galante Deroutante (review of Istanbul Barok's performance of Campra's L'Europe galante), Le Soir, 26 April 1997. (Excerpts also reprinted on artenite.com). Accessed 11 January 2008. (In French)
Woolf, Jonathan, Recording Review: Leyla Pinar: Clavecin, Pavane ADW 7225, MusicWeb International, May 2002.
Yüksel, Gülsen, Barok’un altın kızları, Milliyet, 8 June 2000. Accessed 11 January 2008. (In Turkish)

Musicians from Istanbul
Harpsichordists
Baroque musicians
Living people
Turkish women pianists
21st-century organists
Year of birth missing (living people)
Women organists
Women harpsichordists
21st-century women pianists